Salavatsky District (Salawat rayonı) is an administrative and municipal district (raion), one of the fifty-four in the Republic of Bashkortostan, Russia. It is located in the northeast of the republic and borders Duvansky District in the north, Kiginsky District in the northeast, Chelyabinsk Oblast in the east, south, and west, and Nurimanovsky District in the west. Its administrative center is the rural locality (a selo) of Maloyaz. As of the 2010 Census, the total population of the district was 26,566, with the population of Maloyaz accounting for 18.5% of that number.

History
The district was established on January 31, 1935 as Maloyazovsky District. On March 4, 1941, it was given its present name, in honor of Salawat Yulayev, a Bashkir national hero who was born in the village of Tikeyevo and who played a role in Pugachev's Rebellion.

Administrative and municipal status
Within the framework of administrative divisions, Salavatsky District is one of the fifty-four in the Republic of Bashkortostan. The district is divided into sixteen selsoviets, comprising sixty rural localities. As a municipal division, the district is incorporated as Salavatsky Municipal District. Its sixteen selsoviets are incorporated as sixteen rural settlements within the municipal district. The selo of Maloyaz serves as the administrative center of both the administrative and municipal district.

Demographics

In terms of ethnic composition, 66% of the population are Bashkirs, 22% are Tatars, and 10% are Russians.

References

Notes

Sources

Districts of Bashkortostan
States and territories established in 1935